Alliance for Democracy may refer to:
 Alliance for Democracy (Dominican Republic)
 Alliance for Democracy (Malawi)
 Alliance for Democracy in Mali
 Alliance for Democracy (Nigeria)
 Alliance for Democracy (UK)
 Alliance for Democracy (USA)
 Alliance for Democracy, a fictional multinational organization in S. M. Sterling's Domination of Draka series of alternate-history novels

See also
Alliance of Democracies
Alliance of Democrats (disambiguation)
Democratic Alliance (disambiguation)